The Spain women's national under-23 football team, also known as Spain B or España Promesas ('Spain Promises'), is the national representative Women's association football team of Spain at under-23 age level, and is controlled by the Royal Spanish Football Federation, the governing body of football in Spain.

A squad first convened for assessment and training in October 2019, without playing any matches.

Players

Current players 
 The following players were called up for friendly match against Belgium on 17 February 2022.
Caps and goals as of 30 November 2021

Recent call-ups
 The following players were also named to a squad in the last 12 months.

Results and fixtures

References

External links
 Under-23 national team at the Royal Spanish Football Federation.

Youth football in Spain
European women's national under-23 association football teams
Women's national under-23 association football teams
Football